Indus Public School, Rohtak is a day-boarding school in Rohtak, Haryana, India. It operates two campuses, nursery and senior wing, in the city.

Description
School was founded by Industrialist and Philanthropist Chaudhary Sri. Mitter Sen Sindhu in 2003 (late) under Sindhu Education Foundation that runs several educational trusts and institutes under Indus Group of Institutions and Param Mitra Manav Nirman Sansthan. The school is affiliated with  Central Board of Secondary Education, New Delhi (CBSE).

The school has two campuses: a Nursery wing Sindhu Bhawan, Subhash Nagar, Rohtak, and a Senior Wing at Delhi Road, Rohtak. The school has well-equipped laboratories, libraries, computer rooms, classrooms, sports facilities, music room, medical treatment room, and school transport.

Notable alumni

IAS Ankita Chaudhary
Yadvinder

See also
Education in India
Literacy in India  
List of institutions of higher education in Haryana
 Indus Group of Institutions
 Param Mitra Manav Nirman Sansthan

References

External links
 Indus Public School, Rohtak   - Official Website

Boarding schools in Haryana
Schools in Haryana
Education in Rohtak
Educational institutions established in 2003
2003 establishments in Haryana